Gerald Edward Connolly (born March 30, 1950) is an American politician serving as the U.S. representative for Virginia's 11th congressional district, first elected in 2008. The district is anchored in Fairfax County, an affluent suburban county south of Washington, D.C. It includes all of Fairfax City and part of Prince William County. Connolly is a member of the Democratic Party.

Early life
Connolly graduated from Maryknoll College in Glen Ellyn, Illinois, with a B.A. in literature in 1971, and completed a Master of Public Administration from Harvard's Kennedy School of Government in 1979.

Early career
Connolly worked from 1979 to 1989 with the United States Senate Committee on Foreign Relations, where he managed committee oversight of international economic issues, international narcotics control, and United Nations and Middle East policies, and published reports on U.S. policy in El Salvador, Central America, Israel, and the Persian Gulf region. From 1989 to 1997, he was Vice President of the Washington Office of SRI International. He was also Director of Community Relations for SAIC (Science Applications International Corporation).

In local politics, Connolly served on the Fairfax Government Reorganization Commission from 1992 to 1993. In 1995, he was elected Providence District Supervisor, serving for nine years.

Fairfax County Board of Supervisors 

Connolly's career as a public official began on March 28, 1995, when he won a special election for the Providence District seat on the Fairfax County Board of Supervisors, defeating Republican Jeannemarie A. Devolites. A rematch against Devolites in November of that same year saw Connolly reelected to a full four-year term on the board. Connolly ran unopposed for reelection in November 1999. He was elected Chairman of the Fairfax County Board of Supervisors in 2003 and reelected in 2007.

As chairman of the ten-member board, Connolly balanced a $4.5 billion budget and managed a county that would be the nation's 13th-largest city, 12th-largest school district, and sixth-largest office market. He served as chairman of the county's Legislative Committee and vice-chair of the Economic Advisory Committee. Connolly also served as chairman of the board of the Northern Virginia Transportation Commission (NVTC), chairman of the Northern Virginia Regional Commission (NVRC), and was chairman of the board of the Metropolitan Washington Council of Governments (MWCOG). He also chaired the region's Emergency Preparedness Taskforce and represented Fairfax County on the board of the Virginia Association of Counties (VaCo), where he also served as president.

U.S. House of Representatives

Committee assignments
Committee on Foreign Affairs (2009–present)
Subcommittee on the Middle East and South Asia (2009–present)
Subcommittee on Asia and the Pacific (2013–present)
Committee on Oversight and Reform (2009–present)
Subcommittee on Government Operations (chairman; 2013–present)
Subcommittee on Economic Growth, Job Creation and Regulatory Affairs (2013–present)
U.S. Delegation to NATO Parliamentary  Assembly (chairman; 2013–present) 

Past committee assignments
Committee on the Budget (2009-2011)
Foreign Affairs Subcommittee on Terrorism, Nonproliferation, and Trade (2011-2013)
Oversight Subcommittee on Federal Workforce, Post Office, and the District of Columbia (2011-2013)
Oversight Subcommittee on Government Management, Organization, and Procurement (2011-2013)

Caucus memberships
American Sikh Congressional Caucus
Congressional Arts Caucus
Congressional Taiwan Caucus (co-chair) 
Congressional Cloud Computing Caucus (co-chair)
Congressional Cement Caucus
New Democrat Coalition
House Baltic Caucus
Congressional Asian Pacific American Caucus
U.S.-Japan Caucus

Legislation sponsored
Federal Information Technology Acquisition Reform Act (H.R. 1232; 113th Congress) As the ranking member of the House Committee on Oversight and Government Reform, Connolly co-sponsored this bill with Darrell Issa. It is a proposed bill that would make changes and reforms to the current framework that manages how the federal government buys new technology. One of the requirements would be that the government develop a streamlined plan for its acquisitions. The bill would increase the power of existing chief information officers (CIO) within federal agencies so that they could be more effective. Each agency would also be reduced to having only one CIO in the agency, who is then responsible for the success and failure of all IT projects in that agency. The bill would also require the federal government to make use of private sector best practices. The bill is intended to reduce IT procurement related waste. Explaining the bill, Connolly said that "there are more than 250 identified CIOs in the federal government, yet none possess the necessary authority to effectively manage IT investments" which has "resulted in duplicative and wasteful IT spending." It passed the House in a voice vote on February 25, 2014.

Government Reports Elimination Act of 2014 (H.R. 4194; 113th Congress) As the ranking member of the House Committee on Oversight and Government Reform, Connolly co-sponsored this bill with Darrell Issa. It is a proposed bill that would eliminate approximately 100 required federal agency reports that are considered redundant or wasteful. Connolly argued that "in today's challenging fiscal environment, it is incumbent that we leverage every opportunity to streamline or eliminate antiquated agency reporting requirements that are duplicative, irrelevant or simply ignored." The bill passed in the House in a voice vote on April 28, 2014.

Political positions

Abortion 
Connolly is pro-choice. He voted against the Stupak Amendment to the Affordable Care Act, which placed stringent limits on health insurance companies offering abortion services. During the budget amendments process in 2011, he voted against an amendment that would have prevented taxpayer funds from going to Planned Parenthood.

Trump impeachment 
Connolly voted in favor of the articles of the first impeachment of Donald Trump. He said during debate on the articles that extorting "a foreign country to investigate your political opponent is an unconstitutional abuse of power. To solicit foreign interference in an American election is an unconstitutional abuse of power."

Civil liberties 
Connolly has voted for the National Defense Authorization Act for Fiscal Year 2012 regarding funding the US Armed Forces, including the paychecks delivered to soldiers but also including a controversial provision that allows the government and the military to detain anyone "who was part of or substantially supported al-Qaeda, the Taliban, or associated forces that are engaged in hostilities against the United States or its coalition partners", and anyone who commits a "belligerent act" against the United States or its coalition allies in aid of such enemy forces, under the law of war, "without trial, until the end of the hostilities authorized by the Authorization of Use of Military Force." The law would not grant new powers to the President but does codify federal court rulings on this issue and the detainment of unlawful combatants until hostilities are over is in accordance to the Geneva Conventions.

Economics 
Connolly has voted for the American Recovery and Reinvestment Act of 2009, the Omnibus Appropriations Act, 2009, the supplemental appropriations bill that established Cash for Clunkers, and the Cash for Clunkers Extension. Additionally, he voted for all of the 2010 governmental appropriations bills, and he voted for the Continuing Appropriations Act for 2011. He has voted against some large spending bills, including the release of $350 billion in bank bailout funds and a $154 billion spending bill because of concerns these would add to the federal deficit.

He was a cosponsor of pay-as-you-go (PAYGO) budget legislation that was signed into law in February 2010.

In May 2011, Connolly voted to increase the debt ceiling, but the measure failed by a significant margin. It was his third such vote.

Energy 
Connolly voted in favor of the American Clean Energy and Security Act of 2009, saying it would strengthen national security while spurring innovation in the energy industry. In 2010, he voted in favor of ending a moratorium on deepwater drilling rigs that met certain safety standards. Connolly is one of the 35 congressmen who founded the Sustainable Energy and Environment Coalition.

LGBT issues
Connolly supports gay rights, having campaigned against the Marshall-Newman Amendment to the Virginia Constitution, which banned all gay unions from being performed or recognized in Virginia. In Congress, he voted in favor of repealing the contentious "Don't Ask, Don't Tell" law that prohibited gays from serving openly in the military. He has also co-sponsored a few bills that would repeal portions of the Defense of Marriage Act—a federal law that had effectively banned same-sex marriage across the country.

Guns 
While on the Board of Supervisors for Fairfax County, Connolly sponsored an ordinance that would have made it illegal to transport a loaded shotgun in the back of one's car. In Congress, Connolly signed on to a measure that would have closed the gun show loophole by requiring that private sellers of firearms at gun shows engage in the same background check and reporting requirements as registered firearms dealers. Connolly opposes allowing concealed weapons in schools and on college campuses.

In November 2011, Connolly voted against the National Right to Carry Reciprocity Act, which would have exempted non-residents of states that prohibit concealed weapons from those restrictions.

Health care 

In 2009, Connolly was an early supporter of the Democratic health care plan, which ultimately became the America's Affordable Health Choices Act, as well as the public health insurance option, saying at a live chat with constituents in September to a woman from Washington, D.C. that "One of my principles for health care reform is that it increases the choices you have. By setting up a health insurance exchange, we can give your family more insurance choices, hopefully including one that your daughter's doctor chooses to accept". Connolly voted against the Stupak-Pitts Amendment, and in 2010 for the America's Affordable Health Choices Act.

Connolly cited deficit reduction in explaining his health care vote.

Connolly has adopted a conservative stance on Medicare for all.

Marijuana 
Connolly supports rescheduling marijuana to expand its availability for research and medicine.

Military veterans 
Connolly was a cosponsor of the Helping Active Duty Deployed Act and the Veterans Health Care Budget Reform and Transparency Act.

Syria 
Connolly supported military intervention in Syria.

Political campaigns

2008

Connolly scored a 24-point victory over his closest opponent, former Congresswoman Leslie L. Byrne, in the 2008 Democratic primary. He then defeated Republican nominee Keith Fimian by more than ten points for the open seat held by Republican incumbent Tom Davis. The Independent Green Party candidate was Joseph P. Oddo.

2010

Connolly was challenged again by Fimian in 2010. Also running were Libertarian David L. Dotson, Independent Green David William Gillis, Jr., and Independent Christopher F. DeCarlo. Connolly won by fewer than a thousand votes.

2012

Connolly was challenged by Republican nominee Chris Perkins, Green nominee Joe Galdo and independent candidates Peter Marchetti, Chris DeCarlo and Mark Gibson. He received 61% of the vote. Connolly was significantly aided by redistricting. The old 11th had been reckoned a swing district, though Davis had held it without serious difficulty due to his popularity in the area. Redistricting made the 11th significantly more Democratic than its predecessor. Barack Obama carried the old 11th with 57% of the vote in 2008, but would have carried it with 61% of the vote under the new lines—making it one of the most Democratic white-majority districts in the South.

2014

Connolly faced Republican Suzanne Scholte, Green Joe Galdo, and Libertarian Marc Harrold in his reelection bid, winning with 56.86% of the vote.

2016

Connolly ran unopposed for reelection in 2016. He was reelected with 87.89% of the vote.

2018

Connolly faced Republican challenger, U.S. Army veteran Jeff Dove and Libertarian Stevan Porter in the 2018 election.

2020

Connolly faced a progressive primary challenger, Zainab Mohsini, ahead of the general election, his first primary challenger. Connolly won the Democratic primary against Mohsini. Connolly defeated Republican Manga Anantatmula in the 2020 election.

Electoral history

|+ Fairfax County Board of Supervisors: Results 1995—2007
! Year
!
! Subject
! Party
! Votes
! %
!
! Opponent
! Party
! Votes
! %
!
! Opponent
! Party
! Votes
! %
!
|-
|1995-Special
||
| |Gerald Connolly
| |Democratic
| |4,478
| |59.0
|
| |Jeannemarie Devolites Davis
| |Republican
| |3,104
| |40.9
|
|
|
|
|
|-
|1995
||
| |Gerald Connolly
| |Democratic
| |10,578
| |55.8
|
| |Jeannemarie Devolites Davis
| |Republican
| |8,371
| |44.1
|
|
|
|
|
|-
|1999
||
| |Gerald Connolly
| |Democratic
| |14,309
| |100.0
|
|Unopposed 
|
|
|
|
|
|
|
|
|-
|2003
||
| |Gerald Connolly
| |Democratic
| |98,419
| |53.1
|
| |Mychele B. Brickner
| |Republican
| |81,319
| |43.9
|
|Other
|5,465
|2.9
|
|-
|2007
||
| |Gerald Connolly
| |Democratic
| |113,830
| |59.5
|
| |Gary H. Baise
| |Republican
| |68,403
| |35.8
|
| |Gail Parker
| |Independent Green
| |8,990
| |4.7

|+ : Results 2008—2022
! Year
!
! Subject
! Party
! Votes
! %
!
! Opponent
! Party
! Votes
! %
!
! Opponent
! Party
! Votes
! %
!
|-
|2008
||
| |Gerald Connolly
| |Democratic
| |196,598
| |54.7
|
| |Keith Fimian
| |Republican
| |154,758
| |43.0
|
| |Joseph P. Oddo
| |Independent Green
| |7,271
| |2.0
|-
|2010
||
| |Gerald Connolly
| |Democratic
| |111,720
| |49.2
|
| |Keith Fimian
| |Republican
| |110,739
| |48.8
|
| |Others
| |
| |4,492
| |2.0
|-
|2012
||
| |Gerald Connolly
| |Democratic
| |202,606
| |61.0
|
| |Christopher Perkins
| |Republican
| |117,902
| |35.5
|
| |Others
| |
| |11,735
| |3.5
|-
|2014
||
| |Gerald Connolly
| |Democratic
| |106,780
| |56.9
|
| |Suzanne Scholte
| |Republican
| |75,796
| |40.4
|
| |Others
| |
| |5,229
| |2.8
|-
|2016
||
| |Gerald Connolly
| |Democratic
| |247,818
| |87.9
|
|Unopposed 
|
|
|
|
| |Others
| |
| |34,185
| |12.1
|-
|2018
||
| |Gerald Connolly
| |Democratic
| |219,191
| |71.1
|
| |Jeff Dove
| |Republican
| |83,023
| |26.9
|
| |Others
| |
| |6,052
| |2.0
|-
|2020
||
| |Gerald Connolly
| |Democratic
| |280,725
| |71.4
|
| |Manga Anantatmula
| |Republican
| |111,380
| |28.3
|
| |Others
| |
| |1,136
| |0.3
|-
|2022
||
| |Gerald Connolly
| |Democratic
| |193,190	
| |66.7
|
| |Jim Myles
| |Republican
| |95,634
| |33.0
|
| |Others
| |
| |852	
| |0.3

Personal life
Connolly and his wife Cathy have lived in Mantua since 1979.

Connolly is also a company member of The Providence Players of Fairfax, a community theatre in Fairfax County, having acted in several of their shows.

In 2004, Connolly was charged with "a misdemeanor count of hit and run" after causing an estimated $500 worth of property damage to a 2003 Ford Explorer and Connolly's 2003 Toyota Camry. Connolly claims he did not realize a collision took place when he swerved and then immediately stalled, forcing the Explorer to collide into Connolly's left front wheel. The Fairfax County Police Department was criticized for giving Connolly special treatment and potentially saving him from being forced to resign for a felony instead of a misdemeanor charge. A judge later dismissed the misdemeanor charge against Connolly, saying Connolly's "position and his duties have caused him to be oblivious to what is going on in his car". David Freddoso criticized the judge's ruling in the Washington Examiner.

References

Further reading
Fimian, Connolly Square Off Burke Connection, October 1, 2008
Connolly Seeks Higher Office, Julia O'Donoghue, Fairfax Connection, October 8, 2008
Connolly: ‘Is there enough spending to be cut?’, Robert Costa, National Review, June 11, 2010

External links

Congressman Gerry Connolly official U.S. House website
Gerry Connolly for Congress

 
 Campaign Finance Summary - Opensecrets.org

|-

|-

1950 births
21st-century American politicians
Democratic Party members of the United States House of Representatives from Virginia
Harvard Kennedy School alumni
Living people
Members of the Fairfax County Board of Supervisors
People from Fairfax County, Virginia
Politicians from Boston
United States congressional aides